From March 12 to June 11, 1968, Democratic Party voters elected delegates to the 1968 Democratic National Convention for the purpose of selecting the party's nominee for President in the upcoming election. After an inconclusive and tumultuous campaign marred by the assassination of Robert F. Kennedy, incumbent Vice President Hubert Humphrey was nominated the 1968 Democratic National Convention held from August 26 to August 29, 1968, in Chicago, Illinois.

The primary season began with incumbent President Lyndon B. Johnson expected to win re-nomination for a second consecutive election, despite low approval ratings following the Tet Offensive in January 1968. His only significant challenger was Eugene McCarthy, an anti-war Senator from Minnesota. After McCarthy nearly won the New Hampshire primary, Johnson ended his re-election campaign and Robert F. Kennedy, another critic of the war and the brother of the late President John F. Kennedy, entered the race. In April, Vice President Hubert H. Humphrey joined the race as the establishment candidate; he did not criticize the war and avoided the primaries.

McCarthy and Kennedy traded primary victories while Humphrey collected delegates through the closed caucus and convention systems in place in most states. The race was upended on June 5, the night of the California and South Dakota primaries. Both races went for Kennedy, but he was assassinated after his victory speech at the Ambassador Hotel. At the moment of his assassination, Kennedy trailed Humphrey in the delegate count, with McCarthy third.

At the convention, Humphrey secured the nomination easily despite anti-war protests outside the convention center; he went on to lose the presidential election narrowly to Richard Nixon. Partly in reaction to Humphrey's victory without entering most state primaries, George McGovern led the McGovern-Fraser Commission, dramatically reforming the nomination process to expand the use of primaries.

Background

1960 and 1964 presidential elections
In 1960, John F. Kennedy won the Democratic nomination over Lyndon B. Johnson. After he secured the nomination at the party convention, Kennedy offered Johnson the vice presidential nomination; the offer was a surprise, and some Kennedy supporters claimed that the nominee expected Johnson to decline. Robert F. Kennedy, the nominee's brother and campaign manager, reportedly went to Johnson's hotel suite to dissuade Johnson from accepting. Johnson accepted, and the Kennedy-Johnson ticket was narrowly elected, but the 1960 campaign intensified the personal enmity between Robert F. Kennedy and Lyndon B. Johnson, which dated to as early as 1953. President Kennedy named his brother to his cabinet as United States Attorney General.

President Kennedy was assassinated on November 22, 1963; Johnson succeeded him with tremendous national popularity amid a wave of mourning and sympathy. Robert Kennedy remained in the cabinet for several months amid what Johnson staffers began to refer to as "the Bobby problem": despite the personal hatred between the two, Democratic voters overwhelmingly favored Kennedy as Johnson's running mate in the 1964 election. Kennedy began to  plan for a nationwide campaign, and in the informal New Hampshire vice-presidential primary, Kennedy defeated Hubert H. Humphrey in a landslide. In July 1964, Johnson issued an official statement ruling out any cabinet member for the vice presidency. Instead, Kennedy ran for and won election to the United States Senate from New York. Johnson was re-elected in a landslide.

Vietnam War

United States involvement in the Vietnam War began as shortly after the end of World War II. In 1964, President Johnson began to dramatically escalate American military presence after the Gulf of Tonkin incident. General William C. Westmoreland, whom Johnson had appointed to command American troops in Vietnam, expanded U.S. manpower from 16,000 to more than 553,000 by 1969.

As U.S. involvement escalated throughout 1964 to 1966, protests against the war escalated in proportion. Several anti-war groups were founded or expanded during the period.

1966 midterms and "Dump Johnson" movement

Amid criticism of U.S. handling of the war from both parties, President Johnson's approval rating sank from a high above 70 percent to below 40 percent by the 1966 midterm elections. The Democratic Party had already begun to split between anti-war "doves" and pro-war "hawks," and the Republican Party gained dozens of seats in Congress.

As opposition grew in 1967, anti-war Democrats led by Allard Lowenstein and Curtis Gans formed the Dump Johnson movement, which sought to challenge the President's re-election. Their first choice was Robert Kennedy, who had sufficiently established himself as a critic of the war and an effective popular campaigner. He declined, as did a series of lesser-known candidates, including Senator George McGovern. Lowenstein finally found a candidate in October 1967, when Minnesota Senator Eugene McCarthy agreed to challenge the President. At first, McCarthy merely expressed his interest, telling Lowenstein, "Somebody has to raise the flag." On November 30, 1967, McCarthy publicly announced his campaign for the nomination.

Kennedy continued to demur, despite pressure from his aides to enter the race and worry that anti-war allies, like George McGovern, would begin to make commitments to McCarthy. On January 30, he again indicated to the press that he had no plans to campaign against Johnson.

In early February 1968, after the Tet Offensive in Vietnam, Kennedy received an anguished letter from writer Pete Hamill, noting that poor people in the Watts area of Los Angeles had hung pictures of Kennedy's brother, President John F. Kennedy, in their homes. Hamill's letter reminded Robert Kennedy that he had an "obligation of staying true to whatever it was that put those pictures on those walls." There were other factors that influenced Kennedy's decision to enter the presidential primary race. On February 29, 1968, the Kerner Commission issued a report on the racial unrest that had affected American cities during the previous summer. The Kerner Commission blamed "white racism" for the violence, but its findings were largely dismissed by the Johnson administration.

However, by early March, he had made up his mind to enter the race, albeit too late to contest the upcoming New Hampshire primary. He may have been influenced by the January Tet Offensive, a victorious Northern assault across South Vietnam, and the February 29 report of the Kerner Commission, which blamed "white racism" for the series of race riots in the summer of 1967 but was largely ignored by the Johnson administration.

On March 10, Kennedy told his aide, Peter Edelman, that he had decided to run and had to "figure out how to get McCarthy out of it." However, Kennedy hesitated to enter the race with McCarthy still in and agreed to McCarthy's request to delay an announcement of his intentions until after the New Hampshire primary.

Candidates

Nominee

Competed in primaries
These candidates participated in multiple state primaries or were included in multiple major national polls.

Bypassing primaries
The following candidate did not place his name directly on the ballot for any state's presidential primary, but instead sought to influence selection from unelected delegates or sought the support of uncommitted delegates.

Favorite sons
The following candidates ran only in their home state's primary or caucus for the purpose of controlling its delegate slate at the convention and did not appear to be considered national candidates by the media.

 Governor Roger D. Branigin of Indiana (endorsed Humphrey)
 State Attorney General Thomas C. Lynch of California (endorsed Humphrey)
 Senator George Smathers of Florida (endorsed Humphrey)
 Senator Stephen M. Young of Ohio (endorsed Humphrey)

Declined to run
The following persons were listed in two or more major national polls or were the subject of media speculation surrounding their potential candidacy, but declined to actively seek the nomination.

 Senator Ted Kennedy of Massachusetts
 Former Governor George Wallace of Alabama

Polling

Nationwide polling

Campaign

New Hampshire: March 12
Running as an antiwar candidate in the New Hampshire primary, McCarthy hoped to pressure the Democrats into publicly opposing the Vietnam War. Trailing badly in national polls and with little chance to influence delegate selection absent primary wins, McCarthy decided to pour most of his resources into New Hampshire, the first state to hold a primary election. He was boosted by thousands of young college students who volunteered throughout the state, who shaved their beards and cut their hair to "Get Clean for Gene."

On March 12, McCarthy was the only person on the ballot, as Johnson had not filed, and was only a write in candidate. McCarthy won 42% of the primary vote to Johnson's 58%, an extremely strong showing for such a challenger which gave McCarthy's campaign legitimacy and momentum.

Kennedy enters: March 16
Despite his desire to oppose Johnson directly and the fear that McCarthy would split the anti-war vote, Kennedy pushed forward with his planned campaign. On March 16, Kennedy declared, "I am today announcing my candidacy for the presidency of the United States. I do not run for the presidency merely to oppose any man, but to propose new policies. I run because I am convinced that this country is on a perilous course and because I have such strong feelings about what must be done, and I feel that I'm obliged to do all I can."

Johnson withdraws: March 31

Johnson now had two strong challengers, sitting members of the Senate with demonstrated popularity. To make matters worse, polling in Wisconsin showed McCarthy beating Johnson badly, with the latter getting only 12% of the vote. Facing declining health and bleak political forecasts in the upcoming primaries, Johnson concluded that he could not win the nomination without a major political and personal struggle. On March 31, 1968, at the end of a televised address on Vietnam, he shocked the nation by announcing that he would not seek re-election. By withdrawing, he could avoid the stigma of defeat and could keep control of the party machinery to support Hubert Humphrey, his loyal vice president. As the year developed, it also became clear that Johnson believed he could secure his place in the history books by ending the war before the election in November, which would give Humphrey the boost he would need to win.

After Johnson's withdrawal, the Wisconsin primary on April 2 was effectively uncontested. McCarthy won 56–35%. Kennedy received 6%. Pennsylvania on April 23 was similarly a rout for McCarthy, who took 71% of the vote.

Humphrey declares: April 27
After Johnson's withdrawal, Vice President Hubert Humphrey announced his candidacy on April 27. Humphrey's campaign concentrated on winning the delegates in non-primary states, where party leaders controlled the delegate votes. Humphrey did not compete in the primaries, leaving favorite sons to win delegates as surrogates, notably United States Senator George A. Smathers from Florida, United States Senator Stephen M. Young from Ohio, and Governor Roger D. Branigin of Indiana.

With Johnson's withdrawal, the New Deal Coalition effectively dissolved.

 Hubert Humphrey, Johnson's Vice-President, gained the support of labor unions and big-city party bosses (such as Chicago Mayor Richard J. Daley), who had been the Democratic Party's primary power base since the days of President Franklin D. Roosevelt. It was also believed that Johnson himself was covertly supporting Humphrey, despite the public claims of neutrality.
 McCarthy rallied students and intellectuals who had been the early activists against the war in Vietnam.
 Kennedy gained some support from the poor, Catholics, African-Americans, and other racial and ethnic minorities.
 Conservative white Southern Democrats, or "Dixiecrats," had their influence decline swiftly in the national party and tended to support either Humphrey or former Alabama Governor George C. Wallace, who was running in a third-party campaign for the general election.

McCarthy-Kennedy contests

McCarthy and Kennedy engaged in a series of state primaries. Despite Kennedy's high profile, McCarthy won most of the early primaries, including Kennedy's native state of Massachusetts; however, in primaries where they campaigned directly against one another, Kennedy won three primaries (Indiana, Nebraska, and California) and McCarthy won one (Oregon). Kennedy defeated Roger Branigin and McCarthy in the Indiana primary, and then defeated McCarthy in the Nebraska primary. However, McCarthy upset Kennedy in the key battleground of Oregon, after which it was assumed that McCarthy was the preferred choice of young voters.

California, South Dakota, and New Jersey: June 5
After Kennedy's defeat in Oregon, the California primary was seen as crucial to both Kennedy and McCarthy. McCarthy stumped the state's many colleges and universities, where he was treated as a hero for being the first presidential candidate to oppose the war. Kennedy campaigned in the ghettos and barrios of the state's larger cities, where he was mobbed by enthusiastic supporters. Kennedy and McCarthy engaged in a television debate a few days before the election that was generally considered a draw. On June 4, Kennedy defeated McCarthy in California, 46% to 42%, and also won the South Dakota primary held the same day. McCarthy, who defeated Kennedy in New Jersey that very same night, refused to withdraw from the presidential race and made it clear that he would contest Kennedy in the upcoming New York primary, where McCarthy had much support from antiwar activists in New York City.

Kennedy assassination

After giving his victory speech at the Ambassador Hotel in Los Angeles, California, Kennedy was assassinated in the kitchen service pantry in the early morning of June 5. A Palestinian immigrant with Jordanian citizenship, Sirhan Sirhan, was arrested. Kennedy died 26 hours later at Good Samaritan Hospital.

At the moment of Kennedy's death, the delegate totals were:

Hubert Humphrey 561
Robert F. Kennedy 393
Eugene McCarthy 258

Robert Kennedy's death threw the Democratic Party into disarray. The loss of his campaign, which had relied on his popularity and charisma convincing non-primary delegates to support him at the convention, meant that the antiwar movement was effectively over, and that Humphrey would be the prohibitive favorite for the nomination. Some of Kennedy's support went to McCarthy, but many of Kennedy's delegates, remembering their bitter primary battles with McCarthy, rallied around the late-starting candidacy of Senator George McGovern of South Dakota, a Kennedy supporter in the spring primaries.

Schedule and results
Results by winners:

Statewide results by winner

Total popular vote:
 Eugene McCarthy - 2,914,933 (38.73%)
 Robert F. Kennedy - 2,305,148 (30.63%)
 Lyndon B. Johnson - 383,590 (5.10%)
 Hubert Humphrey - 166,463 (2.21%)
 Unpledged - 161,143 (2.14%)
Johnson/Humphrey surrogates:
 Stephen M. Young - 549,140 (7.30%)
 Thomas C. Lynch - 380,286 (5.05%)
 Roger D. Branigin - 238,700 (3.17%)
 George Smathers - 236,242 (3.14%)
 Scott Kelly - 128,899 (1.71%)
Minor candidates and write-ins:
 George Wallace - 34,489 (0.46%)
 Richard Nixon  - 13,610 (0.18%)
 Ronald Reagan  - 5,309 (0.07%)
 Ted Kennedy - 4,052 (0.05%)
 Paul C. Fisher - 506 (0.01%)
 John G. Crommelin - 186 (0.00%)

 
Primary Map By County (Massachusetts not Included)
Hubert Humphrey - Red
Lyndon B. Johnson - Yellow (outside of Florida)
Robert F. Kennedy - Purple
Eugene McCarthy - Green
George Wallace - Lime Green
Roger D. Branigin - Orange
George Smathers - Yellow (Florida Only)
Stephen Young - Brown

Democratic Convention and antiwar protests
When the 1968 Democratic National Convention opened in Chicago, thousands of young antiwar activists from around the nation gathered in the city to protest the Vietnam War. In a clash covered on live television, Americans were shocked to see Chicago Police officers brutally beating antiwar protesters. While the protesters chanted "the whole world is watching," the police used clubs and tear gas to beat back the protesters, leaving many of them bloody and dazed. The tear gas even wafted into numerous hotel suites. In one of them, Humphrey was watching the proceedings on television. Meanwhile, the convention itself was marred by the strong-armed tactics of Chicago Mayor Richard J. Daley, who was seen on television angrily cursing Connecticut Senator Abraham Ribicoff, who had made a speech at the convention denouncing the excesses of the Chicago police in the riots.

In the end, the nomination itself was anticlimactic, with Humphrey handily beating McCarthy and McGovern on the first ballot. The convention then chose Senator Edmund Muskie of Maine as Humphrey's running mate. However, the tragedy of the antiwar riots crippled the Humphrey campaign from the start, and it never fully recovered. (White, pp. 377-378;)

Source: Keating Holland, "All the Votes... Really," CNN

Endorsements
Hubert Humphrey
 President Johnson 
 Mayor Richard J. Daley of Chicago
 Former President Harry S. Truman of Missouri
 Entertainer Frank Sinatra

Robert F. Kennedy
 Senator Ralph Yarborough of Texas
 Senator Abraham Ribicoff of Connecticut
 Senator George McGovern of South Dakota
 Senator Ted Kennedy of Massachusetts, the candidate's brother
 Governor Harold E. Hughes of Iowa
 Senator Vance Hartke of Indiana
 Writer Norman Mailer
 Labor Leader Cesar Chavez
 Actress Shirley MacLaine
 Actress Angie Dickinson
 Actress Stefanie Powers
 Actor Peter Lawford, the candidate's brother-in-law
 Actor Bill Cosby
 Musician Sammy Davis Jr.
 Musician Andy Williams
 Musician and actress Claudine Longet
 Musicians Sonny & Cher
 Musicians The Byrds
 Musician Bobby Darin
 Artist Andy Warhol
 Astronaut John Glenn
 NFL football Lamar Lundy
 NFL football Rosey Grier
 NFL football Deacon Jones
 Film and television director John Frankenheimer
 Documentary film director Charles Guggenheim
 Actor Warren Beatty
 Actor Tony Curtis
 Actor Jack Lemmon
 Actor Gregory Peck
 Actor Robert Vaughn

Eugene McCarthy
 Representative Don Edwards of California
 Actor Paul Newman
 Actor Gene Wilder
 Actor Dustin Hoffman
 Musicians Simon & Garfunkel
George McGovern (during convention)
 Senator Abraham Ribicoff of Connecticut
 Senator Joseph S. Clark of Pennsylvania
 Governor Harold E. Hughes of Iowa

See also

Republican Party presidential primaries, 1968

References

Further reading
 Alterman, Eric. The Cause: The Fight for American Liberalism from Franklin Roosevelt to Barack Obama (Penguin, 2013).
 Boomhower, Ray E. "Fighting the Good Fight: John Bartlow Martin and Hubert Humphrey's 1968 Presidential Campaign." Indiana Magazine of History (2020) 116#1 pp 1-29. 
 Chester, Lewis, Hodgson, Godfrey, Page, Bruce. An American Melodrama: The Presidential Campaign of 1968. (The Viking Press, 1969).
 
 
 Johns, Andrew L. The Price of Loyalty: Hubert Humphrey's Vietnam Conflict (Rowman & Littlefield, 2020).
 Nelson, Justin A. "Drafting Lyndon Johnson: The President's Secret Role in the 1968 Democratic Convention." Presidential Studies Quarterly 30.4 (2000): 688-713.
 Nelson, Michael. "The Historical Presidency: Lost Confidence: The Democratic Party, the Vietnam War, and the 1968 Election." Presidential Studies Quarterly 48.3 (2018): 570-585.

 Small, Melvin. "The Doves Ascendant: The American Antiwar Movement in 1968." South Central Review 16 (1999): 43-52 online.
 Solberg, Carl. Hubert Humphrey: A Biography. (Norton, 1984).

 White, Theodore H. The Making of the President 1968. (1969)
 

 
1968 Democratic Party (United States) presidential campaigns